Paradiarsia punicea is a moth belonging to the family Noctuidae. The species was first described by Jacob Hübner in 1803.

It is native to Eurasia.

References

Noctuinae